Sanjog ( Coincidence) is a 1985 Indian Hindi-language drama film, produced by P. Mallikharjuna Rao under the Bharati International banner, directed by K. Vishwanath. It stars Jeetendra, Jaya Prada  and music composed by Laxmikant Pyarelal. It is the Hindi version of Viswanath's Telugu film Jeevana Jyothi (1975), starring Sobhan Babu, Vanisri in the pivotal roles

Plot
The film begins at a hill station where Narain takes care of his insane wife Yashoda who is in an asylum. A sort of person that lives in her world singing lullaby to a doll. Besides, Aasha the daughter of Narain’s elder brother Sonu is ready to depart for the U.S.A along with her kid. Thus, Sonu & his wife Lalitha wish Aasha to take the blessing of her uncle which she denies as she dislikes him. However, Sonu coaxes and proceeds when Aasha is disconcerted to know Narain as his real father. Accordingly, Narain spins rearwards. During his college days, Narain loves and marries an innocent naughty village girl Yashoda. The couple starts their marital life in a joint family consisting of Narain’s parents, Sonu & Lalitha, and their child Raju. Lalitha is a vainglory who fails to respect elders and shows carelessness towards her infant. Yashoda oversees the house, sweets Raju as her own, and develops a lot of affection for him. After a few years, Narain well settles and all of them live together happily but Yashoda is perturbed as childless. Raju is completely attached to Yashoda who thinks and calls her a mother that begrudges Lalitha which leads to acrimony. Tragically, Raju dies in an accident when Yashoda becomes a lunatic until she is pregnant. Soon after, the delivery Narain entrusts the baby’s responsibility to Sonu & Lalitha one of that reformed and moves away with Yashoda. Listening to it, grief-stricken Aasha silently meets her mother and trains her child to hook up with Yashoda. Finally, the movie ends with Aasha proceeding to the U.S.A by sacrificing her kid with Narain & Yashoda.

Cast
Jeetendra as Narain 
Jaya Prada as Yashodhara & Asha (Dual role)
Vinod Mehra as Narain's brother 
Bharati Achrekar as Lalita 
Asrani as Chandu
Aruna Irani as Sunaina 
Arvind Deshpande as Narain's dad  
Agha 
Mini Tabassum as Sonu
Goga Kapoor
Yunus Parvez as Lalaji,Chandu Grandfather 
Renu Joshi

Soundtrack 
Lyricist: Anjaan

Reception 
Sanjog was a critically acclaimed movie. It opened to positive to mixed reviews. It also became a hit at the box office.

Awards
Jaya Prada earned her third Filmfare Nomination as Best Actress, the only nomination for the film.

References

External links 
 

1985 films
1980s Hindi-language films
Indian drama films
Hindi remakes of Telugu films
Films directed by K. Viswanath
Films scored by Laxmikant–Pyarelal
1985 drama films
Hindi-language drama films